Tabu may refer to:

Cultural and legal concepts
Taboo (spelled tabu in earlier historical records), something that is unacceptable in society
Tapu (Polynesian culture) (also spelled tabu), a Polynesian cultural concept from which the word taboo derives
Tapu (Ottoman law) (also tabu), a permanent lease of state-owned arable land to a peasant family in the Ottoman Empire
Toubou people of Africa

People
Tabu (actress) (born 1971), Indian actress
Tabu Ley Rochereau (1937–2013), Congolese musician
Tabu Taid (born 1942), Indian educationist, writer and scholar
  Tabu Abdallah, Burundian politician and former finance minister for Burundi

Film and television
Tabu (1931 film), a 1931 award-winning film directed by F. W. Murnau
Tabu (2012 film), a 2012 Portuguese film
 Tabu (TV series), a Finnish dark comedic show
Tabu the Jungle Wizard, a superpowered jungle hero comic book character created by Fletcher Hanks

Music
Tabu, a 2017 album by Timoteij
Tabu, a 2017 album by Lana Jurčević
Tabu, a 2018 album by Michelle
"Tabú" (song), a 2019 song by Pablo Alborán and Ava Max
Tabu Records, an American record label founded in 1975
Tabu Records (Denmark), founded by the Danish group Suspekt in 1998
Tabu Recordings, an independent Norwegian record label founded in 2003

Other uses
Tabu search, a mathematical optimization method
Tabu by Dana, a perfume and cosmetics line from the 1930s manufactured by House of Dana

See also
 Taboo (disambiguation)
 Tabuu, a character from the video game Super Smash Bros. Brawl
 Tabou (disambiguation)